Dylan Thor Richardson (born 15 January 1999) is a South African-Scottish  international rugby union player. He is a utility forward that can play as a loose forward or a hooker.

Rugby Union career

Professional career

International career

Richardson represented South Africa Schools in 2017, making two appearances in the 2017 Under-19 International Series. He was also included in the South Africa Under-20 squad for the 2019 World Rugby Under 20 Championship.

In October 2021 Richardson was named as part of the Scotland training squad for the Autumn nations series, for which he was eligible because his father was born in Scotland. He was subsequently selected for the 42 player full squad for the series. On 18 November 2021 he was named as a replacement for Scotland in their match versus Japan on 20 November 2021. He came on as a second half substitute to win his first cap in that match which Scotland won.

References

1999 births
Living people
South African rugby union players
Rugby union hookers
Rugby union flankers
Rugby union number eights
Rugby union players from KwaZulu-Natal
Sharks (Currie Cup) players
South African people of British descent
White South African people
Sharks (rugby union) players
Scottish rugby union players
Scotland international rugby union players
Alumni of Kearsney College